Eduardo Ignacio Villagra Cabezas (born 11 June 1990), is a Chilean footballer.

Titles

References
 

1990 births
Living people
Chilean footballers
Club Deportivo Universidad Católica footballers
Association football defenders